Hello Goodbye (再見你好嗎) is the seventh studio album by Taiwanese singer-songwriter David Tao, released June 11, 2013.

Track listing

References

2013 albums
David Tao albums
Gold Typhoon Taiwan albums